Joseph Elsner may refer to:

 Józef Elsner (1769–1854), composer
 Joseph Elsner (architect) (1845–1933), German architect